The Houses October Built 2 (titled Hellbent in some countries) is a 2017 American found footage horror film directed by Bobby Roe, who also stars in the film. A sequel to the 2014 film The Houses October Built, its plot follows five characters suffering from trauma a year after the events of the previous film, wherein they were kidnapped and held at a haunted house attraction.

The Houses October Built 2 was written by Bobby Roe and Zack Andrews and was produced by both Zack Andrews and Steven Schneider. The film was released in theaters on September 22, 2017.

Plot

After being rescued from their ordeal at the hands of the Blue Skeleton haunted house, five friends, Brandy, Zack, Bobby, Mikey, and Jeff, decide to get through their post-traumatic stress by facing their fears and going on another haunted house road trip. Brandy refuses to be a part of the road trip, despite the group's continuous efforts to have her join. She finally agrees to come along as long as the group agrees to not do any extreme haunts.

Brandy meets with Dr. Margee Kerr to talk about coping with her past trauma. The group then goes to visit the "Halloween Capitol of the World" in Anoka, Minnesota, and a haunted hayride where they are told to find the extreme haunt, "Hellbent."

The five move onto Georgia, where they partake in zombie-themed attractions. They see a road sign that says to "Seek out Hellbent." During a Redneck-themed haunt, they encounter an actor in a Blue Skeleton mask; and the manager reveals that he is not one of his employees. Brandy becomes upset that this seems to be a setup, but the group offers her more money in exchange for her agreeing to go to "Hellbent."

The Blue Skeleton gasses their van, and they awaken to being moved to the site of "Hellbent" in Outer Banks, North Carolina. Inside the haunt, they are given zippered hooded sweatshirts before being chloroformed. Brandy wakes up and is led through the haunt alone by a masked man. She is then made to watch Mikey be doused in gasoline and set on fire, Bobby being waterboarded with blood and hit with a cinderblock, and Zack have his arm cut off with a chainsaw. When she escapes from the masked man, she finds Jeff, hanged from the ceiling.

Brandy is led to an exit by several women in porcelain doll masks. She finds herself in a courtyard surrounded by men in Blue Skeleton masks who hand her a small coffin with a gun inside. She points the weapon at the men who suddenly remove their masks, revealing themselves as Bobby, Zack, Mikey, and Jeff. Brandy then turns the gun on herself and pulls the trigger, then collapses.

Footage from earlier reveals that the woman in the porcelain mask had showed her footage that revealed that the boys had been setting her up. The woman gives Brandy a prop gun and a blood packet while whispering in her ear.

Brandy rises from the ground shocking the rest of the group who then disclose that their plan was to help Blue Skeleton go viral.

A man in a Blue Skeleton mask is shown rearranging the letters from the sign in Georgia that read "Seek Out Hellbent" to "The Blue Skeleton."

Cast
 Brandy Schaefer as Brandy
 Zack Andrews as Zack
 Bobby Roe as Bobby
 Mikey Roe as Mikey
 Jeff Larson as Jeff
Andrea Hays as Lily Babs the Bearded Lady

Music
A soundtrack and music video was released for the movie on September 1, 2017 titled The Music October Built. It included a re-imagining of the jazz song "Halloween Spooks" by Lambert, Hendricks & Ross and "Blue Skeleton Man" by Mr. RAY.<ref>{{cite web|last=Squires|first=John|title=The Houses October Built 2' Gets Halloween Soundtrack Album|url=https://bloody-disgusting.com/music/3457442/houses-october-built-2-gets-halloween-soundtrack-album/|work=Bloody Disgusting|date=September 6, 2017|accessdate=September 29, 2017}}</ref>

Reception
On Rotten Tomatoes, the film has an approval rating of 13% based on 8 reviews, with an average rating of 3.8/10.

Justin Lowe of The Hollywood Reporter found the film lacking saying "Exhibiting all of the same weaknesses as its predecessor, as well as a fatal lack of originality, this iteration will probably mean the nail in the coffin for this smugly self-regarding series, at least on the theatrical circuit." John Squires of Bloody Disgusting found the sequel underwhelming, saying, "The organic charm of The Houses October Built is mostly absent from The Houses October Built 2, which chooses to rehash the storyline from the first film rather than expand upon any of the interesting threads that were laid out in it" and ultimately giving the film two out of five skulls. Rob Hunter of Film School Rejects found that both the first film and the sequel were guilty of "found footage issues that sink most others using the format;" but whereas the original "succeeds anyway thanks to strong chemistry between the friends and some terrifically creepy sequences," the second film "lacks the scares to make them forgivable."

However, Dread Centrals Matt Boiselle gave the film four out of five stars, writing: "The cinematography is much more streamlined this go-round, and it's nothing but a fun time to be had, that is until the real chills come rolling in, and it's a wait worth holding out for." M. L. Miller of Ain't It Cool News gave the film a positive review but cautioned, "I think the larger scope kind of hurts the overall story. I liked the twists and turns added, but the finale will piss off some," while ultimately saying, "The sequel is bigger and better...The Houses October Built 2 is a fun follow up that’ll please those attracted to the first film." JoBlo says "Like any good sequel, The Houses October Built 2 takes everything we loved from the first film and expands those elements, while at the same time giving us something bigger, better, and faster this go-around."

Home mediaThe Houses October Built 2'' was released on DVD and Blu-ray on January 2, 2018.

References

External links
 
 

2017 films
2017 horror films
American horror films
Found footage films
Halloween horror films
American sequel films
2010s English-language films
2010s American films